Luis Manuel Carmelo Marengo Ramos (born 16 July 1973) is a retired Peruvian footballer who last played for Deportivo Coopsol in the Segunda División Peruana.

Club career
Marengo previously played for a number of clubs in Peru, including Alianza Lima, Sporting Cristal, Coronel Bolognesi and Cienciano.

International career
Marengo has made 13 appearances for the senior Peru national football team from 1996 to 2003.

References

External links

1973 births
Living people
Footballers from Lima
Association football defenders
Peruvian footballers
Peru international footballers
Club Alianza Lima footballers
Sporting Cristal footballers
Alianza Atlético footballers
Coronel Bolognesi footballers
Sport Boys footballers
Cienciano footballers
Juan Aurich footballers
Atlético Torino footballers